Greig Andrew Nori (born November 21, 1962) is a producer and musician from Sault Ste. Marie, Ontario, and is well known as the frontman, co-lead vocalist and guitarist of the pop punk band Treble Charger. In the late 1990s, he began working as a producer with Sum 41 and was their in-house producer and manager until 2004. In 2007, Greig went back to the studio to produce for the pop punk bands Cauterize and Hedley, for their albums Disguises and Famous Last Words, respectively.

Nori is one of the heads of Bunk Rock Music, a Canadian artist management company. He manages bands including Gob, Surplus Sons and The New Cities. He is currently signed as producer by Nettwerk. Since 2008, Nori is featured as the Musical guru on the show DisBAND.

Discography

Treble Charger
Arrangements, songwriting, vocals and guitar throughout all albums:
nc17 (1994)
self=title (1995)
Maybe It's Me (1997)
Wide Awake Bored (2001)
Detox (2002)

Others

References

External links
Bunk Rock Music website

1964 births
Canadian male singers
Canadian record producers
Canadian rock guitarists
Canadian male guitarists
Canadian rock singers
Living people
Musicians from Sault Ste. Marie, Ontario
Treble Charger members